Ho Kah Leong (born 1937) is a former Singaporean politician and was a member of the People's Action Party (PAP). He was the Member of Parliament (MP) for Jurong Single Member Constituency (SMC) from 1966 to 1997. After retirement from politics in December 1996, he became the principal of Nanyang Academy of Fine Arts (NAFA) from 1997 to 2003, and Executive director of NAFA International Pte Ltd from 2003 to 2005.

Education 
Ho studied at Sin Sheng School and then Chung Cheng High School. He went on to study at NAFA from 1955 to 1956 before obtaining a Bachelor of Science degree from Nanyang University in 1963.

Career 
After graduation, Ho became a teacher and taught at Nan Chiau High School and Chung Hwa Girls’ High School.

Ho is additionally an artist and paints oil paintings on nature and serene Malay villages. Ho also does calligraphy. He had also participated in many group exhibitions such as the President’s Charity Art Exhibition in October 1997, and had held 14 solo exhibitions.

Ho frequently donated his paintings and works for charity. His coffee-table book on his works, Beautiful Lion City: The Art of Ho Kah Leong, was sold to raise funds to upgrade PAP Community Foundation kindergartens. He had also produced calendars featuring his paintings to raise funds for others such as building funds for the Basketball Association and the Jurong Town Community Centre.

After retiring from politics in December 1996, Ho joined his alma mater, NAFA, as its principal in 1997. In 2003, he became an Executive director of NAFA International Pte Ltd till 2005.

He is also the president of the Singapore Arts Federation.

Political career
In November 1966, after then Jurong SMC's MP, Chia Thye Poh of Barisan Sosialis (BS), resigned as part of BS boycott of parliament, a by-election was called and Ho, representing the PAP, took the seat after a walkover.

Ho retained his Jurong SMC seat from 1966 to 1996 for eight terms with one uncontested by-election, four uncontested elections and three contested elections.

Ho was also parliamentary secretary for the Ministry of Education and later served as senior parliamentary secretary for the Ministry of Communications and Information and the Ministry of the Environment.

Personal life 
Ho's wife, Kho Choo Eng, passed in 1996. He then remarried Grace Chan Lai Kiew in 1997. He has one son and three daughters.

References

1937 births
Members of the Parliament of Singapore
Singaporean people of Hakka descent
People's Action Party politicians
Living people